George Y. Massenburg (born Baltimore, Maryland c. 1947) is a Grammy award-winning recording engineer and inventor. Working principally in Baltimore, Los Angeles, Nashville, and Macon, Georgia, Massenburg is widely known for submitting a paper to the Audio Engineering Society in 1972 regarding the parametric equalizer.

Background

At 15, Massenburg worked part-time both in the recording studio and in an electronics laboratory.  He attended Baltimore Polytechnic Institute and Johns Hopkins University, majoring in electrical engineering.  As a sophomore, he left the University and never returned.

Massenburg authored a technical paper entitled "parametric equalization" which was presented at the 42nd convention of the Audio Engineering Society in 1972. He is regularly published in professional journals and trade magazines worldwide. In 1973 and 1974, he was chief engineer of Studio Europa-Sonor in Paris, France, and helped Gerhard Lehner install the expanded Neve 80-series console at Barclay Records studio on Avenue Hoche. During those years, Massenburg also did freelance engineering and equipment design in Europe.

Massenburg participated (individually and collaboratively) in over four hundred record albums over the past 45 years.  His work includes recordings of Earth, Wind & Fire, James Taylor, Billy Joel, Toto, Dixie Chicks, Journey, Madeleine Peyroux, Little Feat, Weather Report, Randy Newman, Valerie Carter, Lyle Lovett, Aaron Neville, Kenny Loggins, Mary Chapin Carpenter, Linda Ronstadt, Herbie Hancock, The Seldom Scene, and many more. He has designed, built and managed several recording studios, notably ITI Studios in Hunt Valley, Maryland, Blue Seas Recording in Baltimore, and The Complex in Los Angeles. In addition, he has contributed to the acoustical and architectural design of many other studios, including Skywalker Sound and The Site in Marin County, California.

In 1982, he founded George Massenburg Labs, a pioneering audio electronics company that has released an extensive range of innovative console automation devices, analog signal processors, microphone preamplifiers and power supplies, all based on his original circuit designs.  Among GML’s most venerable products is the GML8200 Parametric Equalizer and the GML8900 Dynamic Range Controller, which reacts to loudness like our ears do, rather than to voltage levels.

Massenburg is also an Associate Professor of Sound Recording at the Schulich School of Music at McGill University in Montreal, Quebec, Canada and a Visiting Lecturer at the University of California, Los Angeles, the University of Southern California, the Berklee College of Music in Boston, and the University of Memphis in Memphis, TN.

Awards and honors
He won the Academy of Country Music award for record of the year in 1988, the Mix Magazine TEC Awards for Producer and Engineer of the year in 1989, the TEC Awards Hall of Fame in 1990 and the Engineer of the year award in 1992. He won a Grammy in 1996, and the Special Merit/Technical Grammy Award in 1998. In 2005, Massenburg was inducted into the TECnology Hall of Fame for his 1969 invention of the ITI ME-230 Parametric Equalizer.  In 2009, he was awarded an honorary Doctorate of Music by Boston’s Berklee College of Music. In 2008 he received the AES Gold Medal.

GML
In 1982, Massenburg founded GML, Inc., which produces equipment for specific recording applications. They have recently introduced the GML 2032 Mic Pre and Parametric EQ, which have been in development for twenty years, along with the GML Automation System, the High Resolution Topology Line-Level Mixing Console and the GML Microphone Pre-Amplifier. GML also consults and does independent design for several major audio electronics manufacturers.

Personal life
Massenburg married Carol "Cookie" Rankin in Mabou, Nova Scotia on July 27, 2001, when he was 54 and she 36. Rankin is one of the founding members of the Rankin Family, a Celtic folk/country band from Cape Breton who were very popular in Canada during the 1990s. She and Massenburg live in Montreal, Quebec, Franklin, Tennessee and Mabou, Cape Breton, Nova Scotia. He has one son, Sam, an electronic musician and performer.

References

External links
 George Massenburg official website
 George Massenburg - The Equalizer
Face to Face with George Massenburg
George Massenburg interview

George Massenburg Interview for the NAMM Oral History Program January 17, 2009

Johns Hopkins University alumni
American audio engineers
Grammy Award winners
Living people
Year of birth missing (living people)
20th-century American inventors
20th-century American engineers
21st-century American engineers
People from Baltimore
Engineers from Maryland
Baltimore Polytechnic Institute alumni
Academic staff of McGill University
University of California, Los Angeles faculty
University of Southern California faculty
Berklee College of Music faculty
University of Memphis faculty